The Asian Society of International Law (AsianSIL) is a region-wide forum for interaction among scholars and practitioners of public and private international law either based in or interested in Asia. It was established in April 2007 at an inaugural meeting at the National University of Singapore.

Mandate

The Society is an international non-partisan, non-profit, and non-governmental organization with the following objectives:
 To promote research, education and practice of international law by serving as a centre of activities among international law scholars and practitioners in Asia and elsewhere, in a spirit of partnership with other relevant international, regional and national societies and organizations;
 To foster and encourage Asian perspectives of international law; and
 To promote awareness of and respect for international law in Asia.

Officeholders

The first president of the Society (2007–2009) was Hisashi Owada, former President of the International Court of Justice.

The current president of the Society is Shirley Scott.

The current Secretary-General of the Society is Antony Anghie.

Publications

In 2011, the Society launched its official journal, the Asian Journal of International Law, published by Cambridge University Press.

Biennial Meetings

The Society organizes major conferences every two years. Meetings have thus far been held in:
 Singapore (2007)
 Tokyo (2009)
 Beijing (2011)
 New Delhi (2013)
 Bangkok (2015)
 Seoul (2017)
 Manila (2019)
 Canberra (to take place in 2021)

References

External links
 

International law organizations
Organizations established in 2007
2007 establishments in Singapore